This is a list of LSU Tigers men's basketball team seasons and history from their first season in 1908–09 to present. Sources:

History

Sources:

Season-by-season results
The following is a list of LSU Tigers basketball seasons with records and notable accomplishments.

  Fatheree left LSU mid-season to join the U.S. Army. A. L. Swanson coached LSU for the remainder of the season.
  LSU's record under Fatheree is 11–7, 4–2 under Swanson.
  Kentucky, which finished first, was ineligible for the conference title. LSU shared the championship with Mississippi State.
  Brady was fired from LSU on February 8, 2008. Butch Pierre was named interim coach for the final 10 games.
  LSU's record under Brady is 192–139, 5–5 under Pierre.
 LSU's conference record under Brady is 74–93, 5–4 under Pierre.
  Tony Benford was interim coach during Will Wade's indefinite suspension.
  LSU's record under Wade is 83–40, 3–2 under Benford.
  LSU's conference record under Wade is 46–24, 1–0 under Benford.

References

 
LSU Tigers
LSU Tigers basketball seasons